is a 2011 Japanese film directed by Tsutomu Hanabusa and based on the manga of the same name. It was released in cinemas in Japan on 1 April 2011.

Cast
 Junpei Mizobata as Yoh Komiyama
 Ito Ohno as Haruna Nagashima
 Masaki Suda as Fumiya Tamura
 Rina Aizawa as Asami Komiyama
 Yuki Furukawa as Yui Asaoka
 Sae Miyazawa as Mami Takahashi
 Rei Okamoto as Makoto Kurihara
 Yuka Masuda as Leona Matsuzaka
 Elaiza Ikeda as Takemoto
 Tsukaji Muga as Tsukaxile
 Yoichi Nukumizu as teacher

Film Festivals
This film was featured in the 3rd Okinawa International Movie Festival in the "Laughs" category.

Theme song
The theme song of the film High School Debut is "Fall in Love", by the band 7!! (pronounced "Seven Oops"). This is the first major label debut by this Okinawan band, which was founded in 2004. This song was released as a digital single on RecoChoku on 1 April 2011. It was ranked 1st in terms of download on the RecoChoku weekly download charts that was announced on 6 April 2011. The singles version of this song was subsequently released by Epic Records Japan on 13 April 2011.

7!! also performed a cover of the 1998 song "Ai no Shirushi" by Puffy. This song was used as an insert song in this film.

See also
 High School Debut, the manga on which the film was based

References

External links
  
 

Live-action films based on manga
Films directed by Tsutomu Hanabusa
Works by Yûichi Fukuda
2010s Japanese films

ja:高校デビュー